Septimiu Cǎlin Albuț (born 23 May 1981) is a Romanian former footballer who played as a goalkeeper for teams such as: FC Baia Mare, ACF Gloria Bistrița, FCM Târgu Mureș, Rapid București or Săgeata Năvodari, among others.

References

External links 
 
 

Living people
1981 births
Sportspeople from Bistrița
Romanian footballers
Association football goalkeepers
Liga I players
Liga II players
Liga III players
CS Minaur Baia Mare (football) players
ACF Gloria Bistrița players
ASA 2013 Târgu Mureș players
FC Rapid București players
AFC Săgeata Năvodari players
FC Viitorul Constanța players
CS Gaz Metan Mediaș players
FC Botoșani players
FC Universitatea Cluj players
CS Gloria Bistrița-Năsăud footballers
21st-century Romanian people